John O'Keefe or O'Keeffe may refer to:

Politicians, diplomats and judges
 John O'Keefe (Irish politician) (1827–1877), Member of Parliament for Dungarvan, 1874–1877
 John O'Keefe (Australian politician) (1880–1942), Queensland state MP
 John Martin O'Keefe (born 1946), U.S. diplomat
 John A. O'Keefe (judge), judge of thee Federal Court of Canada

Scientists
 John A. O'Keefe (astronomer) (1916–2000), American planetary scientist
 John O'Keefe (neuroscientist) (born 1939), American British neuroscientist, 2014 Nobel Prize laureate in Physiology or Medicine

Sportspeople
 John O'Keeffe (Cork hurler) (1894–1973), Irish hurler in the 1910s and 1920s
 John O'Keeffe (Gaelic footballer) (born 1951), Irish footballer who played for Kerry
 John O'Keeffe (Tipperary hurler) (born 1988), Irish hurler in the 2000s
 John O'Keeffe (Australian rules footballer) (born 1943), Australian rules footballer with Fitzroy
 John R. O'Keefe (born 1936), Australian rules footballer with Carlton
 Jack O'Keefe (1915–2000), Australian rules footballer

Other people
 John O'Keeffe (writer) (1747–1833), sometimes O'Keefe, Irish playwright
 John O'Keeffe (painter) ( 1797–1838), Irish painter
 John O'Keefe (playwright) (born 1940), American playwright
 Johnny O'Keefe (1935–1978), Australian rock and roll singer